Ajeej Sarkaria (born 7 February 1995) is a Canadian professional soccer player who last played for FC Edmonton as a forward.

Club career

Early career
Sarkaria played youth soccer with Edmonton Juventus before joining local professional club FC Edmonton in 2011. In 2013, Sarkaria signed his first professional contract with Edmonton as a 17-year-old, but failed to make an appearance that season. He subsequently played overseas in Germany and Sweden before returning to Canada in 2016. In Europe, he joined German organization SV Wehen Wiesbaden and Swedish club Vasalunds IF, as well as briefly for Swedish lower division sixth tier side Fränsta IK, where he scored six goals in eight matches. While in Germany, as an 18 year old, he played with the U23 side, but also tore his MCL.

Calgary Foothills
In 2016, Sarkaria played for USL Premier Development League side Calgary Foothills, making twelve league appearances and adding another five in the playoffs. The following year, he made another thirteen league appearances, scoring one goal, and made another appearance in the playoffs. In 2018, Sarkaria made eight appearances, scoring three goals, and made another three appearances in the playoffs as the Foothills won the 2018 PDL Championship.

While playing for Calgary in the summer Sarkaria attended the University of Alberta, where he scored 37 goals in 42 appearances for the Golden Bears. In 2016, he was named the Canada West Player of the Year and in 2018, Sarkaria set the new all-time Canada West scoring record for career points.

FC Edmonton
In November 2018, Sarkaria was drafted in the second round, 8th overall in the 2018 CPL–U Sports Draft by his former club FC Edmonton. On 13 December 2018, he signed with Edmonton ahead of the club's inaugural season in the Canadian Premier League. On 18 May 2019, Sarkaria made his professional debut as a starter in the Al Classico derby against Cavalry FC. On November 4 Edmonton announced they were parting ways with Sarkaria following the end of the season.

Honours
University of Alberta
U Sports men's soccer Championship: 2016

Calgary Foothills
Premier Development League Championship: 2018

References

External links

1995 births
Living people
Association football forwards
Canadian soccer players
Soccer players from Edmonton
Canadian expatriate soccer players
Expatriate footballers in Germany
Canadian expatriate sportspeople in Germany
Expatriate footballers in Sweden
Canadian expatriate sportspeople in Sweden
FC Edmonton draft picks
FC Edmonton players
Calgary Foothills FC players
Alberta Golden Bears players
USL League Two players
Canadian Premier League players